7th Symphony is the seventh studio album by the Finnish cello metal band Apocalyptica. It was released on August 20, 2010, in Germany, Switzerland and Austria, August 23, 2010, in the rest of the world, and August 24, 2010, in the U.S. and Canada. Released three years after their previous album Worlds Collide, Apocalyptica continued the practice of having four tracks with featured vocalists, while the remaining tracks are all instrumental. Dave Lombardo of Slayer was once again featured on drums, on the track entitled "2010". The band toured with touring vocalist Tipe Johnson in support of the album in Europe, Mexico, Canada, the US and Venezuela since the summer of 2010.

The first single "End of Me" with Gavin Rossdale of Bush on vocals, was premiered on Finnish Radio Ylex on June 7, 2010. It received radio play June 28, 2010, and its release date was on August 6, 2010, in Germany. The second single from the album, "Broken Pieces" with Lacey Sturm, formerly of Flyleaf, was released in October 2010. The third single, "Not Strong Enough" featuring Brent Smith, was released in November 2010, but not in the US, where another version of the song, featuring Doug Robb of Hoobastank on vocals, started playing on US radio on January 18, 2011. The song was re-recorded with Robb after the band failed to secure the rights to release the song with Smith's vocals to U.S. radio from Shinedown's label, Atlantic Records. Accordingly, the promotional video for "Not Strong Enough" was re-released with Doug Robb replacing all scenes that were initially shot with Brent Smith.

The track "Bring Them to Light" was originally written for Worlds Collide, but both Joe Duplantier (of Gojira) and Apocalyptica were unhappy with the original, and so they decided to re-work the track, and re-record it for their next studio album.

Track listing
All tracks produced by Joe Barresi, except for "Not Strong Enough" and "Broken Pieces" produced by Howard Benson.

Notes
A ^"Sacra" is partly inspired by Finnish folk song "Peltoniemen Hintriikan Surumarssi".

Release
7th Symphony was released in six different formats.

Standard CD
Contains the standard 10-track album.

Vinyl LP
Contains the standard 10-track album.

Limited edition CD/DVD
Contains 12 songs (additional tracks being "Through Paris in A Sportscar" and "The Shadow of Venus") and a bonus DVD with filmed acoustic recordings from a session at the Sibelius Academy in Finland, recorded on June 4, 2010.

Digital download
Digital download versions include the standard 10-track edition and the limited 12-track edition of the album, with additional bonus tracks "Spiral Architect" or "Return Game". The iTunes bonus track "Spiral Architect" is a cover of Black Sabbath and was also featured in the free CD available with the September 2010 issue of Metal Hammer.

USB stick
A cello-shaped USB stick with 10 songs, plus "Through Paris In A Sports Car " and "The Shadow Of Venus", as well as "End Of Me" video, On the Road with Apocalyptica tour film (Ukraine 2010) and digital booklet.

Limited red vinyl
Contains standard 10-track album. Released in Germany, Austria and Switzerland only.

Reception

Phil Freeman of Allmusic felt that 7th Symphony was a "string tribute" while Merlin Alderslade of Rock Sound said it was not a spectacular album in comparison to Apocalyptica's previous album Worlds Collide.

Personnel
Perttu Kivilaakso – cello, additional vocals
Paavo Lötjönen – cello, additional vocals
Mikko Sirén – drums, percussion, additional vocals; double bass on 'Beautiful' (live bonus DVD)
Eicca Toppinen – cello, additional vocals
Joe Barresi – producer, mixer
Howard Benson – producer, keyboards and programming (on "Not Strong Enough" and "Broken Pieces")
Chris Lord-Alge – mixer (on "Not Strong Enough")
Johnny Andrews – additional vocals
Lauri Porra of Stratovarius – bass
Paul Bushnell – bass (on "Not Strong Enough" and "Broken Pieces")

Guest musicians
Gavin Rossdale of Bush – vocals on "End of Me"
Brent Smith of Shinedown – vocals on "Not Strong Enough (Album Version)"
 Doug Robb of Hoobastank  vocals on "Not Strong Enough (US Single Version)"
Dave Lombardo of Slayer – drums on "2010"
Lacey Mosley of Flyleaf – vocals on "Broken Pieces"
Joe Duplantier of Gojira – vocals on "Bring Them to Light"

Charts

References

External links 
 Official Apocalyptica website

Apocalyptica albums
2010 albums
Columbia Records albums